RV9 may refer to:
 Mandala 9, the ninth mandala of the Rigveda
 Norwegian National Road 9
 RealVideo 9, a video codec
 Van's Aircraft RV-9, a kit aircraft
 Sonata No. 11 in D Major, RV 9, from Antonio Vivaldi's Twelve Trio Sonatas, Op. 2